Rice Stadium is an American football stadium located on the Rice University campus in Houston, Texas. It has been the home of the Rice Owls football team since its completion in 1950, and hosted John F. Kennedy's "We choose to go to the Moon" speech in 1962 and Super Bowl VIII in early 1974.

Architecturally, Rice Stadium is an example of modern architecture, with simple lines and an unadorned, functional design. The lower seating bowl is located below the surrounding ground level. Built solely for football, the stadium has excellent sightlines from almost every seat. To achieve this, the running track was eliminated so that spectators were closer to the action and each side of the upper decks was brought in at a concave angle to provide better sightlines. It is still recognized in many circles as the best stadium in Texas for watching a football game. Entrances and aisles were strategically placed so that the entire stadium could be emptied of spectators in nine minutes.

In 2006, Rice University upgraded the facility by switching from AstroTurf to FieldTurf and adding a modern scoreboard above the north concourse. Seating in the upper deck is in poor condition, which led the university to move home games for which large crowds were expected to nearby NRG Stadium.

High school football games, especially neutral-site playoff games, are frequently played at Rice Stadium. It can also be used as a concert venue.

History
Rice Stadium replaced Rice Field (now Wendel D. Ley Track and Holloway Field), which had a total capacity of less than 37,000, in 1950. The new stadium was subsidized by the City of Houston, and it was designed by Hermon Lloyd & W.B. Morgan and Milton McGinty and built by Brown and Root.

In addition to Rice, the University of Houston Cougars played at Rice Stadium from 1951 through 1964, and the Bluebonnet Bowl was played there from 1959 to 1967, 1985, and 1986. The Houston Oilers of the American Football League (AFL)  played in the stadium for three seasons (1965–1967), then moved to the Astrodome in 1968.

In January 1974, the venue hosted Super Bowl VIII, the first played in Texas, in which the defending champion Miami Dolphins defeated the Minnesota Vikings 24–7 with 68,142 in attendance. The game returned to Houston thirty years later in February 2004, for Super Bowl XXXVIII at Reliant Stadium.

John F. Kennedy speech

On September 12, 1962, Rice Stadium hosted the speech in which President John F. Kennedy challenged Americans to meet his goal, set the previous year, to send a man to the Moon by the end of the decade. In the Wednesday afternoon speech, he used a reference to Rice University football to help frame his rhetoric:

"But why, some say, the Moon? Why choose this as our goal? And they may well ask, why climb the highest mountain? Why, 35 years ago, fly the Atlantic? Why does Rice play Texas? We choose to go to the Moon. We choose to go to the Moon. We choose to go to the Moon in this decade and do the other things, not because they are easy, but because they are hard, because that goal will serve to organize and measure the best of our energies and skills, because that challenge is one that we are willing to accept, one we are unwilling to postpone, and one which we intend to win, and the others, too."

Kennedy's comments implied Rice had a history of losing to Texas; however, the two football teams had split 5–5 in their previous ten meetings and tied the following month. On the other hand, Kennedy's comments about Rice-Texas might have been as forward-looking as his statements about going to the Moon (which did occur in 1969): Since 1963, Rice has gone just  against Texas, including 28 straight losses between 1966 and 1993 and thirteen straight from 1995 to the present.

Monsters of Rock Tour 1988
On July 2, 1988, Rice Stadium hosted a stop on the Monsters of Rock tour. The tour was headlined by Van Halen and also featured Metallica, Scorpions, Dokken, and Kingdom Come. This was also the Texas World Music Festival.

Capacity reduction

As originally built, Rice Stadium seated 70,000, the second-largest stadium in the Southwest Conference (behind the Cotton Bowl). Rice Stadium was built before professional football came to Houston, and 70,000 fans might be expected to attend a college football game there. However, Rice found it increasingly difficult from the 1960s onward to compete against schools that were ten times its size or more, and in some cases had more freshmen than Rice had undergraduates. In 2006, the end zone seats were covered with tarps, reducing seating capacity to 47,000. However, in the event of larger-than-expected crowds, it can easily be expanded to its full capacity, which is larger than the total number of Rice's living alumni. The average attendance for Rice football games in Rice Stadium was 13,353 in 2007. For the 2008 season, average home attendance was 20,179. During the 2009 season, average home attendance dipped once again to 13,552 per game. However, for the 2012 season it was 20,325.

Brian Patterson Sports Performance Center 

Around July 2015, construction began on the Brian Patterson Sports Performance Center. This building will make up the north end of the stadium, and contain a weight room, a home team locker room, coaching and staff offices. This will replace the north end seating, and lower possible capacity considerably. However, the seating removed consisted of crude concrete steps, and were rarely used. The building was named for donor and former Rice University football player and alumnus Brian Patterson.

See also
 List of NCAA Division I FBS football stadiums

References

External links

Rice Stadium website
Rice Stadium - John F. Kennedy Moon Speech and Apollo 11 Mission Video
Houston Business Journal

Houston Cougars football venues
Houston Oilers stadiums
College football venues
American Football League venues
Defunct NCAA bowl game venues
Rice Owls football
American football venues in Houston
1950 establishments in Texas
Sports venues completed in 1950